Marcelo Martinez-Ferro was born in Buenos Aires and graduated from the Buenos Aires University School of Medicine in 1983. He completed his residency in pediatric surgery at the Ricardo Gutierrez Children´s Hospital and in 1988, joined the staff of Garrahan national Children`s Hospital. In 1992 he completed a fellowship at the Fetal Treatment Center of the UCSF where he confirmed his interest in fetal treatment and video surgery.

In 2001 Dr. Martinez-Ferro along with the CEMIC Surgical and Obstetrical Team performed the first fetal surgery in a patient with myelomeningocele in Argentina.

In 2001, Martinez-Ferro worked with pectus carinatum patients, providing a nonsurgical treatment of their condition using dynamic compression braces, building on work of Brazilian orthopedist Sydney Haje and coworkers.

Dr. Martínez-Ferro is currently the professor of surgery and pediatrics, Chief Division of Pediatric Surgery, at the Fundacion Hospitalaria Children´s Hospital in Buenos Aires.

He is a member of the editorial board of the Journal of Pediatric Surgery. He is also part of the editorial board of other journals indexed in Index Medicus as "Fetal Diagnosis and Therapy" and the "Journal of Laparoendoscopic and Advanced Surgical Techniques ".

He is the recent past-president of the International Pediatric Endosurgery Group.

He is the author of the book "Neonatologia Quirurgica" (Surgical Neonatology), published in 2004.

References 

Living people
Year of birth missing (living people)